Corine Mauch (born 28 May 1960 in Iowa City) is a Swiss Social Democrat politician who serves as mayor of Zurich. She is the first female and first openly lesbian person to be elected mayor of the city.

Political career
Mauch was elected mayor in March 2009, after ten years on the city council. In the first round of balloting, she finished in second place, barely 1,300 votes behind Kathrin Martelli, the candidate of the Free Democratic Party. In the second round, she received 41,745 votes, beating Martelli by 58 percent to 42. In the March 2018 elections, Mauch received 63,139 votes, and she was re-elected as mayor of Zürich until her terms ends in 2022.

Personal life
Mauch is the daughter of Ursula Mauch, who led the Social Democratic Party in the federal parliament. She grew up in the canton of Aargau before attending ETH Zurich, where she studied agricultural economics, and the Swiss Graduate School of Public Administration (IDHEAP). She began the procedure to renounce her United States citizenship in 2012; her office confirmed media reports of the renunciation in April 2013.

References

External links 

  Corine Mauch's website

1960 births
Living people
ETH Zurich alumni
Lesbian politicians
LGBT mayors
Swiss LGBT politicians
Swiss lesbians
Women mayors of places in Switzerland
Mayors of Zürich
Former United States citizens
American emigrants to Switzerland
People from Aargau
Swiss city councillors
20th-century Swiss women politicians
20th-century Swiss politicians
21st-century Swiss women politicians
21st-century Swiss politicians
21st-century Swiss LGBT people